Sunnansjö is a locality situated in Ludvika Municipality, Dalarna County, Sweden. It had 560 inhabitants in 2010.

Notable residents
 Viking Björk (1918-2008), cardiac surgeon

References 

Populated places in Dalarna County
Populated places in Ludvika Municipality